The Virginia Washington Monument, also known as the Washington Monument, is a 19th-century neoclassical statue of George Washington located on the public square in Richmond, Virginia. It was designed by Thomas Crawford (1814-1857) and completed under the supervision of Randolph Rogers (1825-1892) after Crawford's death. It is the terminus for Grace Street. The cornerstone of the monument was laid in 1850 and it became the second equestrian statue of Washington to be unveiled in the United States (following the one in Union Square, New York City, unveiled in 1856). It was not completed until 1869.

Description
Below Washington, (finished after the American Civil War) includes statues of six other noted Virginians who took part in the American Revolution: Thomas Jefferson, Patrick Henry, Andrew Lewis, John Marshall, George Mason, and Thomas Nelson Jr.  The lowest level has bronze female allegorical figures that represent relevant events or themes.

On February 22, 1862, the monument was the location for the second inauguration of the President and Vice President of the Confederate States. The presidential oath of office was administered to Jefferson Davis by Judge J.D. Halyburton and the vice presidential oath to Alexander H. Stephens by senate president R.M.T. Hunter. Elements of the statue were incorporated into the Seal of the Confederate States.

See also
 List of statues of George Washington
 List of statues of Thomas Jefferson
 List of sculptures of presidents of the United States
 National Register of Historic Places listings in Richmond, Virginia
 National symbols of the Confederate States

References

Further reading

External links

Washington Monument at the Library of Congress

Washington Monument
Washington Monument
Equestrian statues in Virginia
Washington Monument
Washington Monument
Washington Monument
Monuments and memorials to George Washington in the United States
Washington Monument
Washington Monument
Richmond, Virginia
Statues of Thomas Jefferson
Terminating vistas in the United States
Washington Monument